Virgin queen may refer to:

a queen bee that has not yet mated with a drone
Elizabeth I, Queen of England

See also
The Virgin Queen (disambiguation)
Christina, Queen of Sweden, also known as "The Girl King"